The anal sinuses (rectal sinuses) are furrows in the anal canal, that separate the anal columns from one another. The anal sinuses end below in small valve-like folds, termed anal valves.

References

External links
  — "The Female Pelvis: The Rectum"
 

Digestive system